The Stop the Importation and Trafficking of Synthetic Analogues (SITSA) Act of 2017 is a bill that passed the United States House on June 15, 2018.

References 

Proposed legislation of the 115th United States Congress
Drug control law in the United States